Enzo Trapani (1922–1989) was an Italian screenwriter, set designer, TV show producer/director and film director.

Selected filmography
 Turri il bandito (1950)
 Destiny (1951)
 Brief Rapture (1951)
 Viva il cinema! (1952)
 Highest Pressure (1965)

Tv Shows
Abito da sera (1960)
Gente che va, gente che viene (1960) - serial
Piccolo concerto (961)
Cabina di regia (1962)
Il signore delle ventuno (1962)
Alta pressione (1962)
Smash (1963)
Senza rete (1968-1969-1970-1971-1972)
Campioni a Campione (1969)
Sicilia happening (1970)
Hai visto mai? (1973)
Angeli e cornacchie (1975)
La compagnia stabile della canzone con varieté e comica finale (1975)
Su e giù per le Dolomiti (1976)
Rete tre (1976)
Il guazzabuglio (1977)
Scuola serale per aspiranti italiani (1977)
Non stop (1977 - 1978)
Stryx  (1978)
Fantastico (1979-1980-1982-1983)
Superclassifica show (1978 - 1981)
C'era due volte (1980)
Te la do io l'America (1981)
Hello Goggi (1981)
Dueditutto (1982)
Te lo do io il Brasile (1984)
Tastomatto (1985)
Proffimamente non stop (1987)
Io Jane, tu Tarzan (1988)

References

Bibliography 
 Piero Pruzzo & Enrico Lancia. Amedeo Nazzari. Gremese Editore, 1983.

External links 
 

1922 births
1989 deaths
20th-century Italian screenwriters
Italian male screenwriters
Italian film directors
Mass media people from Rome
20th-century Italian male writers
1989 suicides
Suicides by firearm in Italy